Events during the year 2018 in Northern Ireland.

Incumbents
 First Minister – Vacant
 deputy First Minister – Vacant
 Secretary of State for Northern Ireland – James Brokenshire (until 8 January), Karen Bradley (from 8 January)

Events 

15 January – Resignation of Sinn Féin MP, Barry McElduff, which will result in a by-election for West Tyrone on 3 May; the seat is retained by Sinn Féin.
10 October – In a unanimous decision, the Supreme Court of the U.K. rules the Christian owners of Ashers Baking Co. were not obliged by law to make a cake featuring the words "Support Gay Marriage".

The arts

4 January – Sitcom Derry Girls, set in the 1990s, premieres on Channel 4 television.
4 April – The BBC Radio 2 Folk Awards take place at the Waterfront Hall in Belfast.
May – Anna Burns' novel Milkman, set in a fictionalised Belfast during The Troubles, is published; on 16 October it is awarded the Man Booker Prize, making the author its first winner from Northern Ireland.

Sports

Deaths 
 3 March – Arthur Stewart, footballer (Glentoran, Derby County, Detroit Cougars) (b. 1958)
 7 July – William Dunlop, motorcycle racer, collision during practice (b. 1985)
 10 July – John Laird, Baron Laird, Unionist politician (b. 1944)
 5 September – Robert Coulter, Unionist politician, MLA for Antrim North (1998–2011) (b. 1929)
 22 September – Jo Gilbert, film producer (Closing the Ring) and casting director, brain tumour (b. 1955 in England)
 4 October – Bertie McMinn, footballer (Distillery, Glenavon, Moyola Park), cancer (b. 1958)
 11 October – Jimbo Simpson, UDA paramilitary, lung cancer, 60

See also 
 2018 in England
 2018 in Scotland
 2018 in Wales

References 

Northern Ireland